Andrej Fašánek (born 1 December 1979) is a Slovak wrestler. He competed in the men's freestyle 58 kg at the 2000 Summer Olympics.

References

1979 births
Living people
Slovak male sport wrestlers
Olympic wrestlers of Slovakia
Wrestlers at the 2000 Summer Olympics
Sportspeople from Bratislava